Lior is a Jewish given name which means "my light" in Hebrew. Alternative spellings include Leeor, Leor, and Lyor. A female variant is Leora.

Lior may refer to the following persons:
 Lior, Israeli-born Australian singer-songwriter
 Lior Arditti (born 1977), Israeli basketball player
 Lior Ashkenazi, Israeli actor
 Lior Asulin, Israeli football player
 Lior Ben-David, Israeli professional wrestler
 Lior Eliyahu (born 1985), Israeli basketball player
 Lior Giterman (born 1993), Israeli-American investor
 Lior Jan, Israeli football (soccer) player
 Lior Lubin (born 1979), Israeli basketball player and coach
 Lior Mor (born 1976), Israeli tennis player
 Lior Narkis, Israeli singer who represented Israel in the Eurovision Song Contest 2003
 Lior Perlmutter, member of the Israeli Goa trance group Astral Projection
 Lior Rafaelov, Israeli football (soccer) player
 Lior Raz (born 1971), Israeli actor and screenwriter
 Lior Rosner, composer, primarily of the Power Rangers franchise
 Lior Schleien, Israeli satirist
 Lior Shamriz, German-Israeli film director
 Lior Suchard, Israeli mentalist

Leor
 Leor Dimant (born 1972), Latvian-American musician
 Leor Weinberger (born 1977), Canadian scientist

Lyor
 Lyor Cohen (born 1959), American music industry executive

See also
 Leor Energy, a natural gas company in Texas
 Leora

Notes and references 

Hebrew-language given names
Hebrew masculine given names